TSS Gazelle was a passenger vessel built for the Great Western Railway in 1889.

History

She was built by Cammell Laird in Birkenhead as one of a trio of new ships for the Great Western Railway as a twin-screw steamer for the Channel Island Services. The other ships were TSS Antelope and TSS Lynx.

In 1907 most of the passenger accommodation was removed and she was then operated on cargo services.

She served as a minesweeper in the Mediterranean Sea during World War I and was finally broken up after 36 years service in 1925.

References

1889 ships
Passenger ships of the United Kingdom
Steamships of the United Kingdom
Ships built on the River Mersey
Ships of the Great Western Railway